Spilarctia grandimacula is a moth in the family Erebidae. It was described by Rob de Vos and Daawia Suhartawan in 2011. It is found in Papua and Papua New Guinea. It has been recorded from the Central Mountains in western Papua, east into Papua New Guinea.

References

Moths described in 2011
grandimacula